Cloesia normalis is a moth of the subfamily Arctiinae. It is found in Colombia.

References

Lithosiini